Dubh (ar thitim Shrebenice, 11ú Iúil, 1995) also known as Black (on the fall of Srebrenica, 11 July 1995), is a poem by Irish poet Nuala Ní Dhomhnaill about the Srebrenica massacre, the July 1995 killing of an estimated 8,000 Bosniak men and boys, as well as the expulsion of 25,000–30,000 refugees in the area of Srebrenica in Bosnia and Herzegovina, by units of the Army of Republika Srpska (VRS) under the command of General Ratko Mladić during the Bosnian War. Dubh relates Ní Dhomhnaill's reaction to the massacre. Her original version and a translation by Paul Muldoon are included in An Leabhar Mòr, published in 2008.

References
 An Leabhar Mòr/The Great Book of Gaelic, ed. Theo Dorgan and Malcolm Maclean, 2008.

20th-century poems
21st-century poems
Irish poems
Irish-language literature
Srebrenica massacre